David Franklin Sayre (January 14, 1822 – May 3, 1919) was an American pioneer, lawyer, state legislator, and farmer.

Born in Madison, New Jersey, Sayre graduated from the City University of New York and then studied law in Patterson, New York. He moved to Fulton, Wisconsin Territory in 1840 and then settled on a farm in Porter, Wisconsin. Sayre was a farmer, practiced law, and was a real estate agent for a southern corporation in Wisconsin. Sayre served in many town and county offices. In 1873, Sayre served in the Wisconsin State Assembly as a Republican although later in life, Sayre was an Independent. Sayre died at the home of his son in Porter, Wisconsin.

Notes

Further reading
 Sayre, David F. "Early Life in Southern Wisconsin". Wisconsin Magazine of History, vol. 3, no. 4 (June 1920): 420–427.

1822 births
1919 deaths
People from Madison, New Jersey
People from Fulton, Wisconsin
City College of New York alumni
Businesspeople from Wisconsin
Farmers from Wisconsin
Wisconsin lawyers
Wisconsin Independents
19th-century American politicians
People from Porter, Wisconsin
19th-century American lawyers
Republican Party members of the Wisconsin State Assembly